Delight of the Muses is a ballet made by New York City Ballet's ballet master in chief Peter Martins to eponymous music by Charles Wuorinen, commissioned by City Ballet as part of its commemoration of the bicentennial of the death of Wolfgang Amadeus Mozart. The composer has taken fragments of Mozart piano sonatas K.231 and K. 283 and music from Don Giovanni for this tribute to Mozart. The premiere took place on 29 January 1992 at the New York State Theater, Lincoln Center.

Cast

Original 

   
Darci Kistler
 
Jock Soto
Nilas Martins

Reviews 

 
NY Times review by Anna Kisselgoff, January 31, 1992
NY Times review by Jennifer Dunning, February 15, 1993 

NY Times article by Allan Kozinn, January 3, 1996

Ballets by Peter Martins
Ballets by Charles Wuorinen
1992 ballet premieres
New York City Ballet repertory
Serial compositions